After Worlds Collide (1934) is a sequel to the 1933 science fiction novel, When Worlds Collide. Both novels were co-written by Edwin Balmer and Philip Wylie. After Worlds Collide first appeared as a six-part monthly serial (November 1933 through April 1934) in Blue Book magazine. Much shorter and less florid than the original novel, this one tells the story of the survivors' progress on their new world, Bronson Beta, after the destruction of the Earth.

Synopsis
Bronson Alpha, the larger of two rogue planets, collided with and destroyed the Earth, before leaving the solar system. However, its companion, the roughly Earth-sized Bronson Beta remained behind and settled into a stable, but eccentric, orbit around the sun.

In a desperate attempt to save a portion of humanity, the United States and several other countries feverishly constructed space arks to transport a select few to Bronson Beta. The Americans, under the leadership of Cole Hendron, managed to launch two space Arks, carrying hundreds of people, as well as the animals, plants and knowledge they will need to hopefully survive on the alien planet. Both American ships reach this new world, as do at least two others, though all four become separated and each is unaware of the fates of the others.

The survivors of Hendron's own, smaller Ark set out to establish a colony, aware (from a road they find) that an alien civilization once existed on Bronson Beta. Tony Drake and another associate scout out for suitable farmland, but during their return journey following the alien road, the two men come across a vehicle. After a mysterious disease strikes the camp, killing three colonists, Hendron forbids exploration, but some of the colonists defy him and strike out, bringing back wood from a distant forest. That night, an aircraft passes near the camp, beating a hasty retreat when the campfire is spotted.

Kyto, Tony's Japanese former manservant, finds a piece of blank paper blowing in the wind: watermarked in English, it provides a first clue that another group of Earth survivors have landed on Bronson Beta. It is revealed later in the story that a group made up of Germans, Russians and Japanese intend to establish a "soviet" called "The Dominion of Asian Realists."

At Hendron's order, an exploratory aircraft is built from remnants of the Ark and its rockets, and Tony Drake sets off with writer Eliot James. They follow the road and discover a domed city. Finding a native poster portraying a Bronson Beta female, Drake and James learn that the Bronson Beta natives were essentially humanoid and had considerably higher technology than humanity. This species built five such cities to survive their world's departure into interstellar space, but ultimately decided to simply become extinct after they were completed. Later in the story, once a linguist within the group deciphers the Bronson Beta language, it is learned that the five domed cities were named Gorfulu, Khorlu, Strahl, Danot and Wend by their builders.

The Americans explore the city (Wend). Then they fly south and discover a searchlight in the dark. It comes from the second American Ark, which had a disastrous landing. There is a joyous reunion with its commander, Dave Ransdell. Ransdell's camp also encountered a mysterious aircraft.

Tony and Ransdell fly back to Hendron's camp, finding that Hendron is visibly deteriorating in health and mind. Tony is jealous that Ransdell apparently will become their new leader and will also have Eve, Hendron's daughter, as his wife. Eve, acting as Hendron's regent, sends Tony to deliver a radio to the Ransdell camp. The first message reports that Hendron's camp has come under some sort of attack. Tony and one of Ransdell's men investigate; they find everyone lying on the ground.

They discover everyone is alive, but drugged; they give the doctor antidotes and then hear an aircraft approaching, occupied by men with Slavic features. After the aircraft leaves, Tony prepares weapons (rocket tubes from the Ark) to defend the camp. An armada arrives soon afterward, but is totally obliterated.

The people gradually wake up. Hendron hands command over to Tony, to Ransdell's relief. Tony decides to occupy one of the alien cities, not the one they found, but another one nearby (Khorlu — later renamed Hendron-Khorlu); they follow the road there.

During the trip, they encounter an alien automobile driven by a British woman; she explains that a British ship also made it from Earth, but landed in a lake; they were found the next day by the "Dominion of Asian Realists" group, which Hendron nicknames "Midianites", and enslaved. The Midianites' society is structured like an ant farm, the colony being all important and the people nothing, but the top rulers live luxuriously.

Tony's group settle into the alien city, and tractors are sent to bring Ransdell's contingent. Tony names their new home Hendron (later renamed as Hendron-Khorlu). Hendron himself dies just as the convoy came into view of the city. The scientists manage, with the Briton's help, to figure out how to charge the batteries and operate the machinery. They also find hangars housing alien aircraft; some are armed and used for air defense.

Meanwhile, the planet is approaching aphelion, and nobody is entirely certain that it is in a stable orbit around the sun. The weather gets colder, and one night, the Midianites, who have settled in the largest domed city (Gorfulu, which also controls power to the other four cities), disconnect Hendron-Khorlu's power supply. One woman defects to the Midianites, while four others attempt to reach Gorfulu using a high-speed car in an underground service tunnel. They are unsuccessful, but the female "defector" kills the Midianite leader, defeats his key people, and allows the British to take control.

The Dominion is defeated, and the victorious American/British coalition settles into the domed cities, along with the former Midianites. While challenges remain, their immediate needs for shelter, energy, and food are taken care of. The story ends on an optimistic note with a reference to the first pregnancy among the colonists, Eve and Tony's, and the confirmation that they have passed aphelion and are definitely locked into orbit around the sun.

Unproduced film
In the mid-1950s, George Pal toyed with the idea of producing a sequel to his 1951 film When Worlds Collide, which would likely have been based on this novel. However, the box office failure of Conquest of Space set back his career for the remainder of the decade and destroyed any chance of a sequel.

References
 

1934 American novels
1934 science fiction novels
American science fiction novels
American post-apocalyptic novels
Novels about impact events
Rogue planets in fiction
Space exploration novels
Novels by Edwin Balmer
Novels by Philip Wylie
Collaborative novels
Sequel novels